Jamal Antoine Foreman (born February 18, 1976) is a former American football linebacker in the National Football League (NFL) with the Buffalo Bills, the Houston Texans, and the New York Giants.  He played college football at the University of Nebraska-Lincoln and was drafted in the fifth round of the 1999 NFL Draft.
After retiring, he started a business called Foreman Fitness. He is the son of Minnesota Vikings running back Chuck Foreman.

Early life
Foreman originally started playing high school football at Eden Prairie High School, but transferred to Minnetonka High School and then transferred back to Eden Prairie.

He also earned an MBA from Harvard Business School.

College statistics

Notes - Statistics include bowl game performances.

References

1976 births
Living people
People from Eden Prairie, Minnesota
American football linebackers
Nebraska Cornhuskers football players
Buffalo Bills players
Houston Texans players
New York Giants players
Players of American football from Minnesota
Sportspeople from the Minneapolis–Saint Paul metropolitan area
Harvard Business School alumni
San Francisco 49ers players